Pseudaraeococcus nigropurpureus is a species of flowering plant in the family Bromeliaceae, endemic to Brazil (the state of Bahia). It was first described in 2007 as Araeococcus nigropurpureus.

References

Bromelioideae
Endemic flora of Brazil
Flora of the Atlantic Forest
Flora of Bahia
Plants described in 2007